El padre Gallo (English title:The priest Gallo) is a Mexican telenovela produced by Juan Osorio for Televisa in 1986. It is an original story of Arturo Moya Grau, adapted by M.J. Rubio and directed by Gonzalo Martínez Ortega. It starred first actor Ernesto Gómez Cruz with Alejandra Ávalos and Fernando Ciangherotti.

Plot
The setting is the small town of Cuetzalan which El Gallo, a bandit fugitive from justice who plans to avoid being found reaches. He decides on hiding in the village so no one ever suspect where he is. There he is confused by the village faithful for the new priest it was expected would come to town. The problem is that this priest died on the way and the Bandit found his body.

As he was dressed as an inmate he decided to take the cassock and dress himself in it. Now El Gallo has no choice but to go along with the villagers and impersonating a priest, a point in his favor because no one would ever suspect a priest as a fugitive from justice. Thus, "The priest Gallo" becomes the new priest of Cuetzalán that despite his obvious inexperience, soon the sympathy and affection of all the inhabitants win.

Alongside a love story starring Ray and Patricio develops. The first is a beautiful girl who disguises herself as a man for the day to keep her jobs, because if they were to discover that she was a woman she would be fired immediately. While the second is a young man who knows one night while dressed as a woman and falls for her.

Ray rightful, but suffers from not being able to see with Patricio during the day because she is not willing to lose the job that she worked so hard to achieve. Therefore, two lovers appear only at night, when Ray can show your true self and live freely her relationship with Patricio without arousing suspicion.

Cast 
Ernesto Gómez Cruz as Padre Gallo
Alejandra Ávalos as Ray
Fernando Ciangherotti as Patricio
Saby Kamalich as Aurora
Narciso Busquets as Don Indalecio
Antonio Medellín as Víctor
Humberto Dupeyrón as El Mudo
Dolores Beristáin as Doña Nati
Odiseo Bichir as Juan Francisco
Socorro Bonilla as Yolanda
Sergio Acosta as Javier
Rosa María Moreno as Carmela
Evangelina Martínez as Miriam
Guillermo Gil as Ramón
Marcela Camacho as Nina
Edith Kleiman as Gladys
Ignacio Retes as Fabián
Paco Rabell as Eulalio
Uriel Chávez as Güicho
Licha Guzmán as Meche
Sergio Sánchez as Gaspar
Mario Valdés as Cipriano
Madeleine Vivo as Mina
Mario Casillas

Awards

References

External links

1986 telenovelas
Mexican telenovelas
1986 Mexican television series debuts
1987 Mexican television series endings
Television shows set in Mexico
Televisa telenovelas
Mexican television series based on Chilean television series
Spanish-language telenovelas